Happy High School is a public high school located in Happy, Texas (USA) and classified as a 1A school by the UIL It is part of the Happy Independent School District located in northern Swisher County.   In 2013, the school was rated "Met Standard" by the Texas Education Agency.

Demographics
The demographic breakdown of the 110 students enrolled for the 2012–2013 school year is as follows:
Male - 53.6%
Female - 46.7%
Hispanic - 16.4%
White - 83.6%

According to the NCES, these are the only racial groups represented at this school.

Athletics
The Happy Cowboys compete in the following sports 

Cross Country, 6-Man Football, Basketball, Golf, Tennis & Track, and High School Rodeo.

State Titles
One Act Play 
1969(1A)

References

External links
Happy ISD
List of Six-man football stadiums in Texas

Schools in Swisher County, Texas
Public high schools in Texas
Public middle schools in Texas